The Fox is an album by American trombonist Urbie Green featuring performances recorded in 1976 and released on the CTI label.

Track listing
 "Another Star" (Stevie Wonder) - 7:14 
 "Goodbye" (Gordon Jenkins) - 2:57 
 "Mertensia" (David Matthews) - 4:58 
 "You Don't Know What Love Is" (Gene de Paul, Don Raye) - 3:59 
 "Manteca" (Gil Fuller, Dizzy Gillespie, Chano Pozo) - 6:35 
 "Foxglove Suite" (Richard Wagner) - 7:27 
 "Please Send Me Someone to Love" (Percy Mayfield) - 5:31 
Recorded at Van Gelder Studio in Englewood Cliffs, New Jersey in July, October and November 1976

Personnel
Urbie Green - trombone
Joe Farrell - flute, soprano saxophone
Jeremy Steig - flute
Fred Gripper - electric piano
Barry Miles - piano, keyboards
Mike Abene - piano
Eric Gale - guitar
Anthony Jackson - electric bass
George Mraz - bass
Jimmy Madison, Andy Newmark - drums
Mike Mainieri - vibraphone
Toots Thielmans - harmonica, whistle
Sue Evans, Nicky Marrero - percussion
David Matthews - arranger, footsteps

References

CTI Records albums
Urbie Green albums
1976 albums
Albums produced by Creed Taylor
Albums arranged by David Matthews (keyboardist)
Albums recorded at Van Gelder Studio